Inathukanpatti, also known as Inayathukkanpatti, is a village in the Thanjavur taluk of Thanjavur district, Tamil Nadu, India.

Demographics 

As per the 2001 census, Inathukanpatti had a total population of 3369 with  males and  females. The sex ratio was 988. The literacy rate was 65.08.

References 

Villages in Thanjavur district